Palaeonycteris is an extinct genus of the horseshoe bat family. It is the only fossil genus of the horseshoe bats, and the only other genus in the family besides Rhinolophus. It is known from the Oligocene of Europe. The type species of the genus is Palaeonycteris robustus.

Several species have been assigned to this genus:
Palaeonycteris insignis von Meyer, 1845
Palaeonycteris praecox von Meyer, 1845
Palaeonycteris robustus Pomel, 1853

References

Rhinolophidae
Fossil taxa described in 1853
Taxa named by Auguste Pomel
Oligocene bats
Oligocene mammals of Europe
Prehistoric bat genera